Dollar is the name of more than 20 currencies. The United States dollar, named after the international currency known as the Spanish dollar, was established in 1792 and is the first so named that still survives. Others include the Australian dollar, Brunei dollar, Canadian dollar, Eastern Caribbean dollar, Hong Kong dollar, Jamaican dollar, Liberian dollar, Namibian dollar, New Taiwan dollar, New Zealand dollar, Singapore dollar, Trinidad and Tobago Dollar and several others. The symbol for most of those currencies is the dollar sign $ in the same way as many countries using peso currencies. The name "dollar" originates from Bohemia and a 29 g silver-coin called the Joachimsthaler.

Economies that use a "dollar"

Other territories that use a "dollar"

 : Eastern Caribbean dollar
  (Netherlands): US dollar
 : US dollar (alongside the pound sterling)
 : US dollar
 : Eastern Caribbean dollar
  (Netherlands): US dollar
  (France): Canadian dollar (alongside the euro)
  (Netherlands): US dollar
 : US dollar

Countries unofficially accepting "dollars"

  Afghanistan: US dollar
  Argentina: US dollar
  Bolivia: US dollar
  Cambodia: US dollar
  Cuba: US dollar
  Guatemala: US dollar
  Lebanon: US dollar
  Macau: Hong Kong dollar
  Maldives: US dollar
  Myanmar: US dollar
  North Korea: US dollar
  Panama: US dollar
  Paraguay: US dollar
  Peru: US dollar
  Philippines: US dollar
  Uruguay: US dollar
  Venezuela: US dollar

Countries and regions that have previously used a "dollar" currency

Confederate States of America: The Confederate States dollar issued from March 1861 to 1865
Ethiopia: The name "Ethiopian dollar" was used in the English text on the birr banknotes before the Derg takeover in 1974.
Malaysia: the Malaysian ringgit used to be called the "Malaysian Dollar". The surrounding territories (that is, Malaya, British North Borneo, Sarawak, Brunei, and Singapore) used several varieties of dollars (for example, Straits dollar, Malayan dollar, Sarawak dollar, British North Borneo dollar; Malaya and British Borneo dollar) before Malaya, British North Borneo, Sarawak, Singapore and Brunei gained their independence from the United Kingdom. See also for complete list of currencies.
Sierra Leone: The Sierra Leonean dollar was used from 1791 to 1805.  It was subdivided into 100 cents and was issued by the Sierra Leone Company. The dollar was pegged to sterling at a rate of 1 dollar = 4 shillings 2 pence.
Spain: the Spanish dollar was used from 1497 to 1868. It is closely related to the dollars (Spanish dollar was used in USA until 1857) and euros used today.
Sri Lanka; the Ceylonese rixdollar was a currency used in British Ceylon in the early 19th Century.
Rhodesia: the Rhodesian dollar replaced the Rhodesian pound in 1970 and it was used until Zimbabwe came into being in 1980.
Republic of Texas: the Texas dollar was issued between January 1839 and September 1840.
Zimbabwe: uses the Zimbabwe dollar,and also accepts the South African rand, the US dollar, the Euro, the Pound sterling, the Botswana pula, the Chinese yuan, the Indian rupee and the Japanese yen.

History

Etymology
On 15 January 1520, the Kingdom of Bohemia began minting coins from silver mined locally in Joachimsthal and marked on reverse with the Bohemian lion. The coins would be named Joachimsthaler after the town, becoming shortened in common usage to thaler or taler. The town itself derived its name from Saint Joachim, coupled with the German word Thal (Tal in modern spelling) means 'valley' (cf. the English term dale).

This name found its way into other languages, for example:

 German — Thaler (or Taler)
 Czech, Slovak and Slovenian — tolar
 Slovak — toliar
 Polish — talar
 Low German — daler
 Dutch — rijksdaalder (or daler),
 Danish and Norwegian — rigsdaler
 Swedish — riksdaler
 Spanish — dólar (or real de a ocho or peso duro)
 Hungarian — tallér
 Ethiopian — talari (ታላሪ)
 English — dollar

In contrast to other languages which adopted the second part of word joachimsthaler, the first part found its way into Russian language and became , yefimok (ефимок).

The predecessor of the Joachimsthaler was the Guldengroschen or Guldiner which was a large silver coin originally minted in Tirol in 1486, but which was introduced into the Duchy of Saxony in 1500. The King of Bohemia wanted a similar silver coin which then became the Joachimsthaler.

Europe and colonial North America
The Joachimsthaler of the 16th century was succeeded by the longer-lived Reichsthaler of the Holy Roman Empire, used from the 16th to 19th centuries. The Netherlands also introduced its own dollars in the 16th century: the Burgundian Cross Thaler (Bourgondrische Kruisdaalder), the German-inspired Rijksdaalder, and the Dutch liondollar (leeuwendaalder). The latter coin was used for Dutch trade in the Middle East, in the Dutch East Indies and West Indies, and in the Thirteen Colonies of North America.

For the English North American colonists, however, the Spanish peso or "piece of eight" has always held first place, and this coin was also called the "dollar" as early as 1581. Spanish dollars or "pieces of eight" were distributed widely in the Spanish colonies in the New World and in the Philippines.

Origins of the dollar sign

The sign is first attested in business correspondence in the 1770s as a scribal abbreviation "ps", referring to the Spanish American peso, that is, the "Spanish dollar" as it was known in British North America. These late 18th- and early 19th-century manuscripts show that the s gradually came to be written over the p developing a close equivalent to the "$" mark, and this new symbol was retained to refer to the American dollar as well, once this currency was adopted in 1785 by the United States.

Adoption by the United States

By the time of the American Revolution, the Spanish dólar gained significance because they backed paper money authorized by the individual colonies and the Continental Congress.  Because Britain deliberately withheld hard currency from the American colonies, virtually all the non-token coinage in circulation was Spanish (and to a much lesser extent French and Dutch) silver, obtained via illegal but widespread commerce with the West Indies. Common in the Thirteen Colonies, Spanish dólar were even legal tender in one colony, Virginia.

On April 2, 1792, U.S. Secretary of the Treasury Alexander Hamilton reported to Congress the precise amount of silver found in Spanish dollar coins in common use in the states. As a result, the United States dollar was defined as a unit of pure silver weighing 371 4/16th grains (24.057 grams), or 416 grains of standard silver (standard silver being defined as 371.25/416 in silver, and balance in alloy). It was specified that the "money of account" of the United States should be expressed in those same "dollars" or parts thereof. Additionally, all lesser-denomination coins were defined as percentages of the dollar coin, such that a half-dollar was to contain half as much silver as a dollar, quarter-dollars would contain one-fourth as much, and so on.

In an act passed in January 1837, the dollar's weight was reduced to 412.5 grains and alloy at 90% silver, resulting in the same fine silver content of 371.25 grains. On February 21, 1853, the quantity of silver in the lesser coins was reduced, with the effect that their denominations no longer represented their silver content relative to dollar coins.

Various acts have subsequently been passed affecting the amount and type of metal in U.S. coins, so that today there is no legal definition of the term "dollar" to be found in U.S. statute. Currently the closest thing to a definition is found in United States Code Title 31, Section 5116, paragraph b, subsection 2: "The Secretary [of the Treasury] shall sell silver under conditions the Secretary considers appropriate for at least $1.292929292 a fine troy ounce."

Silver was mostly removed from U.S. coinage by 1965 and the dollar became a free-floating fiat money without a commodity backing defined in terms of real gold or silver. The US Mint continues to make silver $1-denomination coins, but these are not intended for general circulation.

Usage in the United Kingdom
There are two quotes in the plays of William Shakespeare referring to dollars as money. Coins known as "thistle dollars" were in use in Scotland during the 16th and 17th centuries, and use of the English word, and perhaps even the use of the coin, may have begun at the University of St Andrews This might be supported by a reference to the sum of "ten thousand dollars" in Macbeth (act I, scene II) (an anachronism because the real Macbeth, upon whom the play was based, lived in the 11th century). In the Sherlock Holmes story "The Man with the Twisted Lip" by Sir Arthur Conan Doyle, published in 1891, an Englishman posing as a London beggar describes the shillings and pounds he collected as dollars.

In 1804, a British five-shilling piece, or crown, was sometimes called "dollar". It was an overstruck Spanish eight real coin (the famous "piece of eight"), the original of which was known as a Spanish dollar. Large numbers of these eight-real coins were captured during the Napoleonic Wars, hence their re-use by the Bank of England. They remained in use until 1811. During World War II, when the U.S. dollar was (approximately) valued at five shillings, the half crown (2s 6d) acquired the nickname "half dollar" or "half a dollar" in the UK.

Usage elsewhere
Chinese demand for silver in the 19th and early 20th centuries led several countries, notably the United Kingdom, United States and Japan, to mint trade dollars, which were often of slightly different weights from comparable domestic coinage. Silver dollars reaching China (whether Spanish, trade, or other) were often stamped with Chinese characters known as "chop marks", which indicated that that particular coin had been assayed by a well-known merchant and deemed genuine.

Other national currencies called "dollar"

Prior to 1873, the silver dollar circulated in many parts of the world, with a value in relation to the British gold sovereign of roughly $1 = 4s 2d (21p approx). As a result of the decision of the German Empire to stop minting silver thaler coins in 1871, in the wake of the Franco-Prussian War, the worldwide price of silver began to fall. This resulted in the U.S. Coinage Act (1873) which put the United States onto a 'de facto' gold standard. Canada and Newfoundland were already on the gold standard, and the result was that the value of the dollar in North America increased in relation to silver dollars being used elsewhere, particularly Latin America and the Far East. By 1900, value of silver dollars had fallen to 50 percent of gold dollars. Following the abandonment of the gold standard by Canada in 1931, the Canadian dollar began to drift away from parity with the U.S. dollar. It returned to parity a few times, but since the end of the Bretton Woods system of fixed exchange rates that was agreed to in 1944, the Canadian dollar has been floating against the U.S. dollar. The silver dollars of Latin America and South East Asia began to diverge from each other as well during the course of the 20th century. The Straits dollar adopted a gold exchange standard in 1906 after it had been forced to rise in value against other silver dollars in the region. Hence, by 1935, when China and Hong Kong came off the silver standard, the Straits dollar was worth 2s 4d (11.5p approx) sterling, whereas the Hong Kong dollar was worth only 1s 3d sterling (6p approx).

The term "dollar" has also been adopted by other countries for currencies which do not share a common history with other dollars. Many of these currencies adopted the name after moving from a £sd-based to a decimalized monetary system. Examples include the Australian dollar, the New Zealand dollar, the Jamaican dollar, the Cayman Islands dollar, the Fiji dollar, the Namibian dollar, the Rhodesian dollar, the Zimbabwe dollar, and the Solomon Islands dollar.
 The tala is based on the Samoan pronunciation of the word "dollar".
 The Slovenian tolar had the same etymological origin as dollar (that is, thaler).
 The Swedish Daler used to be the name for the currency and have the same etymological origin as the German thaler).

See also

 Canadian Tire money
 Disney Dollars
 Eurodollar
 List of circulating currencies
 North American currency union Amero
 Petrodollar

References

External links

 Etymonline (word history). for buck; Etymonline (word history) for dollar
 Currency converter. CNNMoney.com

 
Denominations (currency)
Numismatics
Obsolete currencies in Malaysian history